Katharine A. Phillips is an American psychiatrist who specializes in body dysmorphic disorder. She is a professor of psychiatry at NewYork-Presbyterian and Weill Cornell Medicine. She has contributed to more than 350 scientific journals and books and has been featured in interviews with numerous media outlets, such as the New York Times, The Wall Street Journal, Washington Post, and Boston Globe.

She was featured as a guest on the Oprah Winfrey Show and has written many acclaimed books, including The Broken Mirror: Understanding and Treating Body Dysmorphic Disorder and Understanding Body Dysmorphic Disorder: An Essential Guide. To address body dysmorphic disorder in males, she co-authored The Adonis Complex: How to Identify, Treat and Prevent Body Obsession in Men and Boys.

Phillips has been board certified member of the American Board of Psychiatry and Neurology and, as of 2019, she is a Distinguished Life Fellow of American Psychiatric Association. In addition to these achievements, she is also the member of the Body Dysmorphic Disorder Foundation and has spoken at numerous events hosted by the organization.

Select publications 

 Phillips, K.A., Dufresne, R.G. Body Dysmorphic Disorder. Am J Clin Dermatol 1, 235–243 (2000). https://doi.org/10.2165/00128071-200001040-00005
 Phillips, Katharine A. M.D.; Diaz, Susan F. M.D.1 Gender Differences in Body Dysmorphic Disorder, The Journal of Nervous & Mental Disease: September 1997 - Volume 185 - Issue 9 - p 570-577
 Phillips, K. A., McElroy, S. L., Keck, P. E., Pope, H. G., & Hudson, J. I. (1993). Body dysmorphic disorder: 30 cases of imagined ugliness. American Journal of Psychiatry, 150, 302-302.
 Phillips K. A. (2007). Suicidality in Body Dysmorphic Disorder. Primary Psychiatry, 14(12), 58–66.

See also 

 Body dysmorphic disorder
 Weill Cornell Medicine

References 

Living people
American women psychiatrists
Year of birth missing (living people)
Dartmouth College alumni
Geisel School of Medicine alumni